The following is a partial list of prominent National Cemeteries:

Africa

Algeria 
 El Alia Cemetery, Algiers

Burundi
 Mausolée des Martyrs de la Démocratie, Bujumbura

Ghana
 Asomdwee Park, Accra
 Burma Camp Military Cemetery, Accra

Liberia
 Palm Grove Cemetery, Monrovia (former)

Zimbabwe
 National Heroes Acre, Harare

Asia

China 
 Babaoshan Revolutionary Cemetery, Beijing

Indonesia 
 Kalibata Heroes Cemetery, Jakarta
 Giri Tunggal Heroes' Cemetery, Semarang
 Kusumanegara Heroes' Cemetery, Yogyakarta

Iran 
 Behesht-e Zahra, Tehran

Israel 
 Mount Herzl, Jerusalem

Japan 
 Chidorigafuchi National Cemetery, Tokyo

Laos 
 Cimetière Révolutionnaire, Vientiane

Malaysia 
 Taman Selatan, Putrajaya
 Makam Pahlawan, Kuala Lumpur

Mongolia 
 Altan-Ölgii National Cemetery, Ulan Bator

North Korea
 Cemetery of Fallen Fighters of the KPA, Pyongyang
 Fatherland Liberation War Martyrs Cemetery, Pyongyang
 Revolutionary Martyrs' Cemetery, Taesŏng-guyŏk, Pyongyang
 Patriotic Martyrs' Cemetery, Hyŏngjesan-guyŏk, Pyongyang

Philippines 
Libingan ng mga Bayani, Metro Manila

Singapore 
Kranji State Cemetery
Kranji War Cemetery
Mandai Crematorium and Columbarium

South Korea 
 Daejeon National Cemetery, Daejeon
 Seoul National Cemetery, Seoul
 April 19th National Cemetery, Seoul
 March 15th National Cemetery, Changwon
 May 18th National Cemetery, Gwangju
 United Nations Memorial Cemetery, Busan – dedicated to United Nations Command casualties of the Korean War
 Yeongcheon National Cemetery, Yeongcheon

Taiwan 
 National Revolutionary Martyrs' Shrine, Taipei
 Wuzhi Mountain Military Cemetery, New Taipei

Thailand 
 Royal Cemetery at Wat Ratchabophit, Bangkok

Vietnam 
 Mai Dich Cemetery, Hanoi

Europe

Albania 
 National Martyrs Cemetery of Albania

Armenia 
 Komitas Pantheon, Yerevan

Azerbaijan 
 Alley of Honor, Baku

Croatia 
 Mirogoj Cemetery, Zagreb

Denmark 
 Roskilde Cathedral, Roskilde

France
Paris Pantheon, Paris
Note: A former church, not a proper cemetery

Finland 
 Hietaniemi cemetery, Helsinki

Georgia 
 Mtatsminda Pantheon, Tbilisi

Germany (Former) 
 Ehrentempel, Munich
 Tannenberg Memorial

Greece
 First Cemetery of Athens, Athens

Hungary
 Fiumei Road National Graveyard, Budapest
 Farkasréti Cemetery, Budapest

Ireland
Arbour Hill Cemetery, Dublin
Glasnevin Cemetery, Dublin

Italy
Santa Croce, Florence
Note: A church, not a proper cemetery

Poland 
 Powązki Cemetery, Warsaw
 Powązki Military Cemetery, Warsaw

Portugal 
 Church of Santa Engrácia, Lisbon
Note: A church, not a proper cemetery

Russia 
 Kremlin Wall Necropolis, Moscow
 Federal Military Memorial Cemetery, Moscow

Slovakia 
 National Cemetery, Martin

Turkey 
 Turkish State Cemetery, Ankara

Ukraine 
 Baikove Cemetery, Kyiv

North America

Canada 
 Beechwood Cemetery, Ottawa

Mexico 
 Mexico City National Cemetery, Mexico City (established and maintained by the American Battle Monuments Commission for American servicemembers)
 Panteón de Dolores
 Rotonda de las Personas Ilustres

Cuba 
 Santa Ifigenia Cemetery, Santiago de Cuba
 Mausoleo del II Frente Oriental, Santiago de Cuba
 Mausoleo del III Frente Oriental, Santiago de Cuba

Dominican Republic 
Altar de la Patria
National Pantheon of the Dominican Republic

Guatemala 
Guatemala City General Cemetery

Haiti 
Haiti’s National Cemetery in Port-au-Prince

Honduras 
Cementerio General, Trujillo

Jamaica 
National Heroes Park

Nicaragua 
Cementerio General Occidental, Managua

Salvador 
Los Ilustres Cemetery, Salvador

United States 
 United States National Cemetery (full listing)

Oceania

Australia 
 Rookwood Cemetery, Sydney
 Melbourne General Cemetery, Melbourne

South America

Argentina 
 La Recoleta Cemetery, Buenos Aires
La Chacarita cemetery, Buenos Aires

Bolivia 
General Cemetery of Santa Cruz
Cementerio General de Cochabamba

Brazil 
Cemitério de São João Batista, Rio de Janeiro

Chile 
Altar de la Patria of Chile.
Cementerio General de Santiago, Chile.

Colombia 
 Central Cemetery of Bogotá, Bogotá

Ecuador 
San Diego Cemetery, Quito

Paraguay 
National Pantheon of the Heroes, Asunción
Recoleta Cemetery, Asuncion

Peru 
 Presbitero Maestro Cemetery, Lima
 Panteón de los Próceres, Lima

Uruguay 
 Central Cemetery of Montevideo

Venezuela 
 National Pantheon of Venezuela, Caracas

See also 

 American Battle Monuments Commission, which maintains cemeteries for American war dead outside of the United States
 Commonwealth War Graves Commission, which maintains cemeteries for British Commonwealth war dead outside of the United Kingdom
 Lists of cemeteries

References

 
National